Unión Demócrata Cristiana ( - UDC) is a Nicaraguan political party founded by the center-left Popular Social Christian Party (PPSC) and the center-right Democratic Party of National Confidence (PDCN) in 1992. The UDC was part of the Sandinista National Liberation Front alliance from year 2000 until 2012.

References 
 Noticiero Demócrata Cristiano
 Democracia Cristiana Nicaragüense cumple 50 años
 Nicaragua breves

Political parties established in 1992
Christian democratic parties in North America
Political parties in Nicaragua